Milk River Airport  is located  southeast of Milk River, Alberta, Canada.

References

External links
Place to Fly on COPA's Places to Fly airport directory

Registered aerodromes in Alberta
County of Warner No. 5